770 may refer to:

 770, the year
 The 770s (the years from 770 to 779)
 Nokia 770, an Internet tablet device
 Telephone Area code 770, assigned to metropolitan Atlanta, Georgia and its suburbs
 770 Eastern Parkway, the headquarters of the Chabad-Lubavitch Hasidic group
 New Jersey bus route 770

See also
 770 AM